Ebenezer Methodist Church is a historic church located near Bells, Chatham County, North Carolina. It is a modest single-story wood-frame structure, with a steeply-pitched metal gable roof and weatherboard siding. It has Gothic Revival features, including a tower with Gothic-arched entrance openings. The sanctuary's windows, doors, and interior woodworking are original to the structure. It was built about 1890, for a Methodist congregation established in 1827.

The building listed on the National Register of Historic Places in 1985.

References

External links
 Official website

Methodist churches in North Carolina
Churches on the National Register of Historic Places in North Carolina
Carpenter Gothic church buildings in North Carolina
Churches completed in 1890
19th-century Methodist church buildings in the United States
Churches in Chatham County, North Carolina
National Register of Historic Places in Chatham County, North Carolina